Cyril Carne Glenton Wright (7 March 1887 – 15 September 1960) was a Portuguese born English sportsman who played international rugby union for England and first-class cricket.

Cricket career
Wright, who was educated at Tonbridge School, made appearances with the Kent Second XI from 1906 to 1908 but was unable to make it into the firsts. He instead played his First-class cricket at Cambridge University, as a batsman. Despite playing 23 first-class fixtures he passed 50 only once, which was in his innings of 87 against Sussex in 1908.

Rugby career
A rugby union centre, Wright played for Cambridge University R.U.F.C. and played in the Varsity Match during the 1907/08 season winning a sporting Blue. While at Cambridge he was selected for the England national team and played twice for his country, against Ireland and Scotland in the 1909 Home Nations Championship. After leaving university he played club rugby for Blackheath F.C. and county rugby for Kent. He was also selected for invitational touring side the Barbarians.

Personal history
Wright was born in Ramalde in Porto, Portugal in 1887 to Charles Wright. He was educated at Tonbridge School and on leaving Pembroke College, Cambridge he became a schoolmaster, teaching at Tonbridge 1919 to 1929. He served his country during the First World War, joining the Durham Light Infantry, rising to the rank of captain.

References

1887 births
1960 deaths
People educated at Tonbridge School
Alumni of Pembroke College, Cambridge
English rugby union players
England international rugby union players
Cambridge University R.U.F.C. players
Blackheath F.C. players
Barbarian F.C. players
English cricketers
Cambridge University cricketers
British Army personnel of World War I
Durham Light Infantry officers
Gentlemen of the South cricketers